Cia Berg formed the Swedish alternative pop band Whale in 1986.

See also

References

External links
 

living people
place of birth missing (living people)
Swedish women singers
women rock singers
year of birth missing (living people)